This article lists the governors-general of Italian Libya, a colony of the Italian Empire from 1934 to 1943.

List

See also
Italian Libya
Italian Cyrenaica
List of colonial governors of Italian Cyrenaica
Italian Tripolitania
List of colonial governors of Italian Tripolitania
History of Libya
Italo-Turkish War
North African campaign

Footnotes

References

External links
World Statesmen – Libya

Libya
Italian Libya
Lists of political office-holders in Libya

Italian Empire-related lists
Italy–Libya relations